The R&A World Golf Museum (previously known as the British Golf Museum) is located opposite the clubhouse of the Royal and Ancient Golf Club in St Andrews, Scotland. The R&A owns and operates the museum.

The museum, which opened in 1990, documents the history of golf from Medieval times to the present, including the men's and women's games, British and international, both professional and amateur.  Exhibits include historic equipment, memorabilia and art work, documentation, the history of the Royal and Ancient Golf Club, and the rules and terminology of the game.

The museum was established in 1989 in an existing, single-storey building behind the Clubhouse. Construction started in summer 2014 and was completed in June 2015.

The museum reopened on 21 Jun 2021 as The R&A World Golf Museum, previously known as the British Golf Museum.

Women Golfers' Museum
The museum displays part of the collection of the Women Golfers' Museum (WGM), while its books, photographs etc are housed in the special collections of University of St Andrews Library. The WGM was opened in April 1939 at the Lady Golfers' Club in London, with Issette Pearson as president and Mabel Stringer as chairman. In 1961 the Lady Golfers Club merged with the Golfers Club but by 1968 the museum had to find a new home and was displayed in various London clubs and from 1977 to 1980 at Colgate-Palmolive's offices. It was shown in the National Museum of Antiquities in Edinburgh from 1982 to 1984, before moving to its current home. The collection "present[s] a comprehensive history of the ladies' game" and includes material such as Rhona Adair's golf-balls and Poppy Wingate's shoes.

Images of The R&A World Golf Museum

See also
 History of golf
 USGA Museum
 Jack Nicklaus Museum

References

External links 

 Official site

Golf in Scotland
Golf museums and halls of fame
Museums in Fife
Sports museums in Scotland
St Andrews
Museums established in 1990
1990 establishments in the United Kingdom
1990 establishments in Scotland
Buildings and structures completed in 2015
Golf in the United Kingdom
History of golf
Women's golf
Women's museums in the United Kingdom